Lucien Beaumont (born 5 February 1931) is a Canadian former swimmer. He competed in three events at the 1952 Summer Olympics.

References

External links

1931 births
Living people
Canadian male swimmers
Olympic swimmers of Canada
Swimmers at the 1952 Summer Olympics
Place of birth missing (living people)
Swimmers at the 1950 British Empire Games
Commonwealth Games medallists in swimming
Commonwealth Games silver medallists for Canada
Ohio State Buckeyes men's swimmers
Medallists at the 1950 British Empire Games